Holt Lake is a glacial lake that drains into the Kakat Lake, approximately  northeast of Bakers Narrows. As a tributary of Mistik Creek, it is part of the Nelson River watershed, in the Hudson Bay drainage basin in the Northern Region of Manitoba, Canada. The lake sits in Churchill River Upland portion of the Midwestern Canadian Shield forests and is surrounded by mixed forest with stands of black spruce, white spruce, jack pine, and trembling aspen. The shoreline is characterized by steeply sloping irregular rock ridges and poorly drained areas of muskeg.

The region around the lake is largely inaccessible and very wild and is the home to woodland caribou.

Holt lake is named after a trapper who lived on the lake in the 1920s and kept a tame lynx and wolf.

See also
List of lakes of Manitoba

References

Lakes of Northern Manitoba
Glacial lakes of Manitoba